The 1921–22 Harrison S.C. season was the club's first season in the American Soccer League and the inaugural season of the league. The club was previously known as Erie A.A. and played the prior year in the National Association Foot Ball League. Harrison S.C. finished 4th in the league.

American Soccer League

Pld = Matches played; W = Matches won; D = Matches drawn; L = Matches lost; GF = Goals for; GA = Goals against; Pts = Points

National Challenge Cup

New Jersey State Cup

Notes and references
Bibliography

Notes

Footnotes

Harrison S.C.
American Soccer League (1921–1933) seasons
Harrison S.C.